Peykan (also Romanized as Peykān, Pāikān, and Pāyekān) is a village in Jarqavieh Vosta Rural District, Jarqavieh Sofla District, Isfahan County, Isfahan Province, Iran. At the 2006 census, its population was 2,583, in 718 families.

References 

Populated places in Isfahan County